Ali Ibrahim Kébé Baye (born 24 December 1978), commonly known as Ibra Kébé, is a Senegalese former professional footballer who played as a defensive midfielder.

Career
In 2002, Kébé signed for Spartak Moscow and made his Champions League debut in the away defeat to FC Basel.

Despite a relatively bright start to his Spartak career, soon Kébé fell out of favour at the Russian club. The Senegalese defender left Spartak after two seasons with the club. He then played for Spartak Nizhny Novgorod and, after their relegation from the Russian First Division, for FC Dila Gori. In January 2009, Kébé was expected to sign for the newly promoted Premier League side FC Rostov, but the deal fell through because of a serious knee injury.

His younger brother Pape Maguette Kebe played for FC Rubin Kazan.

References

External links
Picture from Anzhi's official website

1978 births
Living people
Sportspeople from Saint-Louis, Senegal
Senegalese footballers
Senegal international footballers
ASC Jeanne d'Arc players
FC Spartak Moscow players
FC Anzhi Makhachkala players
Association football midfielders
Russian Premier League players
Russian First League players
Senegalese expatriate footballers
Expatriate footballers in Russia
Senegalese expatriate sportspeople in Russia
FC Spartak Nizhny Novgorod players